Julie Ann Augustyniak (born February 1, 1979) is an American former professional soccer player who featured primarily as a defender.

Early life 
Augustyniak was born in Norfolk, Virginia and raised in Peachtree City, Georgia. She went to McIntosh High School and then Clemson University. While enrolled, she played for the Clemson Tigers women's soccer team.

Career 
She played for the Atlanta Classics of the W-League from 1997 to 2000, before joining the Beat at the team's inception. She was selected in the eighth round of the 2000 WUSA Draft by the Atlanta Beat as the 64th overall selection. Her twin sister Nancy Augustyniak also played for Atlanta Beat and they were involved in the first instance of two sets of twins that faced each other in a professional game when the Beat played against the Washington Freedom in 2002.

She joined the F.C. Indiana for the 2005 season. The summer of 2006 she played for the Atlanta Silverbacks Women.

Personal life 
She married Christopher Tuff.  She is currently teaching at Holy Inoccent's and coaching at Top Hat.

Career statistics

Club
These statistics are incomplete and currently represent a portion of Augustyniak's career.

References

External links 
 Player profile at Women's United Soccer Association
Julie Augustyniak profile from Atlanta Silverbacks
Twin research: Julie Augustyniak ("Zwillingsforschung") (in German)

1979 births
Living people
People from Peachtree City, Georgia
Sportspeople from the Atlanta metropolitan area
Sportspeople from Norfolk, Virginia
Soccer players from Georgia (U.S. state)
American women's soccer players
Women's association football defenders
Clemson Tigers women's soccer players
Atlanta Beat (WUSA) players
1. FFC Turbine Potsdam players
F.C. Indiana players
Women's United Soccer Association players
American expatriate women's soccer players
American expatriate soccer players in Germany